Twelve Violin Sonatas, Op. 5 (Sonate a violino e violone o cimbalo) is a collection of 12 violin sonatas by Arcangelo Corelli, first published on 1 January 1700. The first edition is dedicated to Sophia Charlotte, Electress of Brandenburg. The first six are sonate da chiesa and the last six are sonate da camera. The last sonata, No. 12, is a set of 23 variations on the theme La Folia.

The title in the first edition. Sonate a violino e violone o cimbalo, calls for a violin, accompanied by a bass violin or harpsichord. The basso continuo part was written in the figured bass notation. There have been different arrangements in performance, ranging from organ, to archlute, to cello.

Influence 

Sir John Barbirolli arranged the Preludio, Allemanda, Gavotte and Giga of No. 10, and Sarabande of No. 7 into an Oboe Concerto, dedicated to his wife, the oboist Evelyn Rothwell.

Selected discography 

 Andrew Manze (violin) and Richard Egarr (harpsichord) – Harmonia Mundi HMU907298/99
 Lina Tur Bonet (violin) and Musica Alchemica – Pan Classics PC10375
 Arthur Grumiaux (violin) and Riccardo Castogne (harpsichord) – Philips
 Locatelli Trio – Hyperion

Reviews of recordings 

 BBC Record Review: Review by Anna French on BBC Radio 3, 5 May 2018
 Review on recording by Manze and Egarr

References

External links 

 Walsh's Edition (London) on Musopen

Interpretations

  performed by Aaron McGregor, violin; Alice Allen, cello; David McGuinness, piano

Corelli
Compositions by Arcangelo Corelli
1700 compositions
Music dedicated to nobility or royalty